John Shirley (born August 29, 1958 in Road Town, Tortola, British Virgin Islands) is a sailor who competed in the Summer Olympics for the British Virgin Islands. He is the son of the late Alexander O. Shirley, a well-known British Virgin Islands cricketer. 

Shirley was a crew member of the Soling class team that competed at the 1992 Summer Olympics for the British Virgin Islands, where the team finished 17th out 24 crews.

References

Olympic sailors of the British Virgin Islands
British Virgin Islands male sailors (sport)
Sailors at the 1992 Summer Olympics – Soling
Living people
1958 births